Wattenscheid is a Stadtbezirk of the city of Bochum. Until 1975, it was a separate town in the Ruhr area of North Rhine-Westphalia. Wattenscheid has a population of about 80,000 citizens. Some notable firms have their headquarters in there, such as Steilmann.

History
Wattenscheid is first mentioned in a church document from Werden Abbey (Kloster Werden in Essen) in AD 880, by the name of Villa Uattanscethe.
The oldest church in Wattenscheid, St. Gertrud von Brabant, was built in the 9th century.

From 1554, Wattenscheid was a member of the Hanseatic League.
During the Thirty Years' War, the area was occupied by Spanish troops from 1623 to 1629. In 1633, imperial auxiliary troops plundered Wattenscheid, before Hessian and Swedish troops arrived. A fire destroyed the city on 15 September 1635.

Wattenscheid was best known as a coal mining town. Starting from the 1720s, the first coal mine was built. By the 1840s, there were about twelve coal mines with around 580 professional miners. This accelerated the development of the city during the period of industrialization. The last coal mine in Wattenscheid and Bochum (Zeche Hannover) was closed in 1973 and is now part of a museum.

Quarters of Wattenscheid
 Mitte
 Eppendorf
 Günnigfeld
 Höntrop
 Leithe
 Munscheid
 Sevinghausen
 Südfeldmark
 Westenfeld

Gallery

Sports

The football club SG Wattenscheid 09, which played at the highest German level for men, the Bundesliga, from 1990 to 1994 and for women, the Women's Bundesliga, in the 2007–08 season, is located in Wattenscheid.

The athletics club TV 01 Wattenscheid is also located in Wattenscheid.

The chess club SV Wattenscheid plays at the highest level in Germany, the Chess Bundesliga.

References

External links

 Heraldry of Wattenscheid

Bochum
Towns in North Rhine-Westphalia